Mech-X4 is an American sci-fi adventure comedy television series created by Steve Marmel that aired on Disney Channel from November 11 to December 4, 2016, and on Disney XD from April 17, 2017 to August 20, 2018. The series stars Nathaniel Potvin, Raymond Cham, Kamran Lucas, Pearce Joza, and Alyssa Jirrels.

Premise 
Ryan Walker is a freshman at Bay City High who has the ability to control technology with his mind. His talent mysteriously awakens Mech-X4, a giant 150-foot robot built by an elusive genius-in-hiding to defend their city against impending doom. Ryan recruits his older brother and two best friends to help him operate Mech-X4. When giant monsters suddenly begin to descend upon Bay City, the four must quickly learn to work as a team in order to pilot the robot that is their only hope of saving the city and world from mass destruction.

Cast and characters

Main 
 Nathaniel Potvin as Ryan Walker, a technopath who serves as the pilot for Mech-X4. He discovers in the first season that he was adopted, and that his biological parents gave him up because they were on the run from Seth Harper.
 Raymond Cham as Mark Walker, Ryan's older brother who serves as the mechanic for Mech-X4. He is very popular and is a star athlete.
 Kamran Lucas as Harris Harris Jr., Ryan's friend who operates the DM shields and defenses for Mech-X4. He is very intelligent and a talented inventor. 
 Pearce Joza as Spyder, Ryan's friend who operates the weapons for Mech-X4. He is dimwitted and often acts on impulse. 
 Alyssa Jirrels as Veracity, a student at Ryan's school who has two fathers and is Harris's academic rival. When Harris breaks his arm, the team recruits Veracity to temporarily take over his role. In the first season, she is a recurring character, but she is promoted to a main character in the second season.

Recurring 
 Ali Liebert as Principal Grey, the school principal who is secretly behind the monster attacks working for Seth Harper. In the second season, she works with Traeger. Her desk secretly has equipment that enables her to combine the DNA of two animals to form a giant monster. Grey later gained the ability to turn into a Clawboon at will.
 Peter Benson as Seth Harper, the billionaire CEO of Harper Futuristics who dates Grace Walker in the first season. In "Let's Get Leo!" he is revealed to be the true mastermind behind the monster attacks, believing that mankind has polluted and destroyed the Earth and needs to be destroyed for the benefit of the planet. In the second season, the Mech-X4 team reluctantly accept his help in improving Mech-X4 to be able to battle Traeger.
 Ryan Beil as Leo, the creator of Mech-X4. His experiments on Ryan's biological parents are the cause of Ryan's technopathic abilities. He used to be close friends with Seth Harper before they became enemies due to Harper's creation of monsters to destroy mankind.
 Alyssa Lynch as Cassie, a reporter for the student newspaper.
 Crystal Balint as Grace Walker, Mark's mother and Ryan's adoptive mother who works as a cook on a food truck.
 John De Santis as Davage, Principal Grey's partner who helps her try to get rid of Mech-X4. When working for Principal Grey and Seth Harper, he posed as the school janitor.
 Dan Payne as Traeger, the main villain of the second season; he was created as a result of the fight between Mech-X4 and Seth Harper's monster. Traeger can shapeshift at will into a reptilian creature.

Production 
The series was renewed for a second season ahead of its season one premiere on September 1, 2016. The second season premiered on Disney XD on September 9, 2017.

Episodes

Series overview

Season 1 (2016–17)

Season 2 (2017–18)

Ratings 
 

| link2             = #Season 2 (2017–18)
| episodes2         = 10
| start2            = 
| end2              = 
| startrating2      = 
| endrating2        = 0.10
| viewers2          = |2}} 
}}

References

External links 
 

2010s American comedy television series
2010s American science fiction television series
2016 American television series debuts
2018 American television series endings
American adventure television series
Disney Channel original programming
Disney XD original programming
English-language television shows
Television series about monsters
Television series about robots
Television shows filmed in Vancouver